Agnes Duff, Countess Fife (12 May 1829 – 18 December 1869), was an Irish-Scottish aristocrat.

Early life
Lady Agnes Georgiana Elizabeth Hay was born at Dublin, Ireland. She was the third child of William Hay, 18th Earl of Erroll, and Elizabeth FitzClarence, one of the illegitimate children of William IV and his mistress Dorothea Jordan.

Marriage and family
On 16 March 1846, Agnes was married to James Duff, son of General Hon. Sir Alexander Duff and Anne Stein, at British Embassy, Paris, France. Duff later inherited the earldom of Fife upon the death of his uncle in 1857. Together, Agnes and James were the parents of six children, five girls and one boy:

 Lady Ida Louisa Alice Duff (1848–1918), who married Adrian Elias Hope, of Deepdene House, on 3 June 1867 and they were divorced. They had one daughter. She remarried William Wilson, a London stockbroker, on 20 September 1880, with no issue.
 Agnes Henriette Ida Mary Hope (1868–1920), who married Edwin Joseph Lisle March-Phillipps de Lisle on 28 August 1889. 
 Lady Anne Elizabeth Clementina Duff (1847–1925), who married John Townshend, 5th Marquess Townshend on 17 October 1865. They had two children:
 John James Dudley Stuart Townshend, 6th Marquess Townshend (17 October 1866 – 17 November 1921) he married Gwladys Sutherst on 9 August 1905. They had two children:
 George John Patrick Dominic Townshend, 7th Marquess Townshend (13 May 1916 – 23 April 2010) he married Elizabeth Luby on 2 September 1939 and they were divorced in 1960. They had three children. He remarried Ann Darlow on 22 December 1960. They had two children. He married, lastly, Philippa Montgomerie of Southannan in 2004.
 Elizabeth Mary Gladys Townshend (16 October 1917 – 31 December 1950) she married Sir Eric Meadows White, 2nd Bt.on 20 October 1939 and they were divorced in 1947. They had one son. She remarried John Roberts on 15 March 1949.
 Sir Christopher Robert Meadows White, 3rd Bt (26 August 1940 – 2015) he married Anne Brown on 14 April 1962 and they were divorced. He remarried Dinah Mary Sutton in 1968 and they were divorced in 1972. He married, lastly, Ingrid Jowett in 1976.
 Lady Agnes Elizabeth Audrey Townshend (1870–1955), who married James Cuninghame Durham, son of Rev. James Durham, on 2 December 1903. They had two children:
 Nicholas Durham (13 January 1905) he married Joyce du Pré in 1934.
 Victoria Durham (1908) 
 Alexander William George Duff, 1st Duke of Fife (1849–1912), who married Princess Louise of Wales, the eldest daughter of Albert Edward, Prince of Wales (later Edward VII) and Alexandra of Denmark (later Queen Alexandra) in 1889 and was created Duke of Fife by Queen Victoria.
 Lady Alexina Duff (1851–1882), who married Henry Coventry, grandson of George Coventry, 8th Earl of Coventry.
 Lady Agnes Cecil Emmeline Duff (1852–1925), who married firstly George Hay-Drummond, son of George Hay-Drummond, 12th Earl of Kinnoull, and had issue. Married secondly Herbert Flower (brother of Cyril Flower, 1st Baron Battersea), with no issue. Married thirdly Alfred Cooper, with issue, including the great-grandmother of former British prime minister David Cameron.
 Lady Mary Hamilton Duff (1854–1854), who died in infancy.

Agnes died at the age of 40. Through her fourth daughter, also named Agnes, she is an ancestor of British prime minister David Cameron.

Ancestry

Notes and sources 

1829 births
1869 deaths
Daughters of Scottish earls
19th-century Scottish people
19th-century Scottish women
Wives of knights